Catherine Upton was a poet and governess who was in Gibraltar during the time of the Great Siege (1779–1783). Her husband was  Lieutenant John Upton of the 72nd Manchester Regiment. In 1787, she published The siege of Gibraltar, from the twelfth of April to the twenty-seventh of May, 1781, an account of life in Gibraltar during the first part of the Siege.

References

External links
Catherine Upton page at the University of Maryland
Catherine Upon page in People of Gibraltar website

British women poets